Salvatore "Red Light" Messina (born March 19, 1939) is an American sportscaster who was a color commentator for the New York Rangers of the National Hockey League (NHL). He won the Foster Hewitt Memorial Award in 2005 and is a member of the media section of the Hockey Hall of Fame. He also had a brief amateur hockey career in the Eastern Hockey League as a goaltender.

References

External links

1939 births
Living people
Foster Hewitt Memorial Award winners
Journalists from New York City
National Hockey League broadcasters
New York Rangers announcers
Sportspeople from New York City